KVOU-FM (104.9 FM) is a radio station licensed to Uvalde, Texas. The station is owned by Javier Navarro Galindo.
 
On June 29, 2022, KVOU-FM ceased operations.

References

External links

VOU-FM